The 2018 North Tyneside Metropolitan Borough Council election took place on 3 May 2018 to elect members of North Tyneside Metropolitan Borough Council in England. This was held on the same day as other local elections.

All of the seats being contested were last contested in 2014, and these results are compared to the  results of 2016.

Battle Hill

Benton

Camperdown

Chirton

Collingwood

Cullercoats

Howdon

Killingworth

Longbenton

Monkseaton North

Monkseaton South

Northumberland

Preston

Riverside

St Mary's

Tynemouth

Valley

Wallsend

Weetslade

Whitley Bay

References

2018 English local elections
2018
21st century in Tyne and Wear